Bučići is a village in the vicinity of Novi Travnik, Bosnia and Herzegovina. Its population was around 1,600 in 2007, 99% of whom were Croat, with the remainder belonging to unspecified ethnic groups. Most of the residents are Roman Catholic.

Demographics 
According to the 2013 census, its population was 437.

Notable people from Bučići 
 Marijan Šunjić
 Frano Zubić

References 

Villages in the Federation of Bosnia and Herzegovina
Populated places in Novi Travnik